Pieusse (Languedocien: Piussa) is a commune in the Aude department in southern France.

Population

Transportation
The closest airport to Pieusse is Carcassonne Airport (15 km).

See also
Communes of the Aude department

References

Communes of Aude
Aude communes articles needing translation from French Wikipedia